Obory-Kolonia  is a village in the administrative district of Gmina Gizałki, within Pleszew County, Greater Poland Voivodeship, in west-central Poland. The main economic activity in the area is agriculture.

References

Obory-Kolonia